Aadmi Aur Insaan is a 1969 Hindi film produced by B. R. Chopra and directed by Yash Chopra. The film stars Dharmendra, Saira Banu, Feroz Khan, Mumtaz, Johnny Walker, Madan Puri, Ajit, Anwar, Iftekhar, Achla Sachdev, Kamini Kaushal and Nazima. The film's music is by Ravi with lyrics by Sahir Ludhiyanvi. "Zindagi Ittefaq Hai " song is still popular .

This is the only movie in which Yash Chopra and Dharmendra have worked together.

Plot
A wealthy and independent industrialist, Jai Kishan befriends a young man from a middle-class background by the name of Munish Mehra (Dharmendra), assists him financially to go abroad and get necessary qualifications as an engineer, and then hires him on one of his construction projects. Meena Khanna (Saira Banu) is the daughter of a government official. Munish and Meena meet and fall in love with each other. Jai also gets attracted towards Meena. Shortly after this, Jai finds out that Munish is in love with Meena, and gets enraged. He subsequently fires Munish, and ensures that he will not get hired anywhere else. After several vain attempts to obtain employment, Munish gets hired by the government, and is assigned to investigate the collapse of a railway bridge. Munish finds out that Jai was directly responsible for this mishap as he used sub-standard materials. Munish now has the tools to take revenge from Jai and destroy him, and accordingly informs his employer. But when the time comes for Munish to make a full report, he declines, and the government has no alternative but to prosecute him in a court of law for taking bribes and destroying his report. And the main witness appearing against him is none other than Jai.

Cast
 Dharmendra as Munish Mehra
 Saira Banu as Meena Khanna
 Feroz Khan	as Jai Kishan / J.K.
 Mumtaz as Rita
 Johnny Walker as Gulam Rasool
 Randhawa as Shanker
 Ajit as Kundanlal / Sher Singh
 Uma Dutt as Sher Singh
 Anwar Hussain as Gupta
 Iftekhar as Saxena
 Gajanan Jagirdar as Judge
 Kamini Kaushal asMrs. Khanna (Meena's mom)
 Poonam Sinha (Komal) as	Renu Mehra
 Manmohan Krishna as Mr. Khanna (Meena's father)
 Roopesh Kumar as Abdul Rashid / Rashu
 Nana Palsikar as Justice B.N. Desai
 Madan Puri as Sabharwal
 Jagdish Raj as Balwa (drunkard)
 Achala Sachdev as Mrs. Mehra (Munish's mom)
 Surekha		
 Ram Avtar	as Sweets Seller (uncredited)
 Keshav Rana as Rana (uncredited)
 Ravikant as Mirza (uncredited)

Soundtrack
Music: Ravi, Lyrics: Sahir Ludhiyanvi.

Awards
 1970 Filmfare Best Supporting Actor Award for Feroz Khan
Nominated
 1971Filmfare Best Supporting Actress Award for Mumtaz

External links 
 

1969 films
1960s Hindi-language films
Films directed by Yash Chopra
Films scored by Ravi